Adam Ragusea (born March 22, 1982) is an American YouTuber who creates videos about food recipes, food science, and culinary culture. Until 2020, Ragusea was a professor of journalism at Mercer University.

Personal life
Ragusea grew up in State College, Pennsylvania. Ragusea attended the Eastman School of Music but left before the end of his first year. He finished his bachelor's degree at Penn State University under Associate Professor of Music Composition Dr. Paul Barsom. Since mid-2021, he has lived in Knoxville, Tennessee, with his wife, novelist Lauren Morrill, and their two children. He previously lived in Macon, Georgia.

Career

Journalism
Adam Ragusea was a journalist in residence at Mercer University from 2014 until February 2020. Ragusea taught introductory and advanced journalism, and media production classes while still a professor at Mercer. Before becoming a professor, Ragusea worked as a reporter for NPR and its affiliates. He was the longtime host of The Pub, a trade podcast for people in public media. While working at Georgia Public Broadcasting, Ragusea was the Macon Bureau Chief and host of the local Morning Edition. Prior to working at GPB, Ragusea worked at WBUR-FM in Boston, and WFIU in Indiana.

YouTube
Ragusea created his YouTube channel on February 12, 2010, and his first videos were food recipes, made with the intention of sharing with his friends. His videos began to garner attention for his "straight-to-the-point" style that is influenced by his background in journalism. He also cites SpongeBob SquarePants as an influence on his style of comedy, describing it as "edgy but fundamentally [...] just a beam of bright sunshine". He launched "The Adam Ragusea Podcast" with the first episode "Dorian Yates Drumsticks" releasing on February 25, 2022. Ragusea announced that he would drop from his usual 2 videos a week along with the podcast to only 1 video a week plus the podcast on December 19, 2022 in a video titled "The next phase of our relationship".

References

American YouTubers
American chefs
1982 births
Living people
Food and cooking YouTubers
Educational and science YouTubers
21st-century American journalists
Mercer University faculty